Grace Umelo (born 10 July 1978) is a retired Nigerian athlete who specialised in the long jump. She won several medals at regional level.

Her personal best in the event is 6.60 metres set in Lagos in 1999.

Competition record

External links

1978 births
Living people
Nigerian female long jumpers
African Games gold medalists for Nigeria
African Games medalists in athletics (track and field)
African Games silver medalists for Nigeria
Athletes (track and field) at the 1999 All-Africa Games
Athletes (track and field) at the 2003 All-Africa Games
20th-century Nigerian women
21st-century Nigerian women